Sitka Township is a township in Clark County, Kansas, USA.  As of the 2000 census, its population was 86.

Geography

The streams of Bear Creek, Day Creek, Snake Creek, Spring Creek and Trout run through this township.

Transportation
Sitka Township contains one airport or landing strip, Shupe Airport.

References
 USGS Geographic Names Information System (GNIS)

External links
 US-Counties.com
 City-Data.com

Townships in Clark County, Kansas
Townships in Kansas